Yehudi or Jehudi (Hebrew: יהודי, endonym for Jew) is a common Hebrew name:

 Yehudi Menuhin (1916–1999), violinist and conductor
 Yehudi Menuhin School, a music school in Surrey, England
 Who's Yehoodi?, a catchphrase referring to the violinist
 Yehudi Wyner (born 1929), composer and pianist
 Jehudi Ashmun (1794–1828), religious leader and social reformer

Other uses 
 Yehudi lights

See also 
 Yahud (disambiguation)
 Yehuda (disambiguation)
 Yuda (disambiguation), / Juda (disambiguation) / Judah (disambiguation)
 Jew (word)